Stacia (born Stacia Blake, 26 December 1952) is an Irish professional visual artist who is also known as the former performance artist/dancer with Hawkwind.

Early years 
Stacia was born in Exeter, Devon, England.

With Hawkwind
Stacia joined the band in 1971; however accounts vary as to how and why she began working with the band.  Liner notes to In Search of Space indicate that poet and lyricist Robert Calvert recruited her for live shows; other sources state that she was a friend of Nik Turner, saxophonist and flautist for the band.  In 2012, Turner told Mojo magazine, "I met Stacia for the first time at the Isle of Wight... She said, "Can I dance with you?" and I said, "Yeah, but you must take off all your clothes and paint your body."  She took all her clothes off but unfortunately I didn't have any body paint.  That was like her audition."  In an interview in British music magazine Melody Maker, Stacia herself stated that she attended a show and, inspired by the music, got on stage and performed an impromptu dance to the band's music. However, in an interview in Prog Magazine, she said in her first time dancing with the band, at the Flamingo Ballroom in 1971, she asked permission from the band members to dance. She immediately became an integral part of the live show after joining in 1971.

According to a 1974 interview in Penthouse, Stacia was six feet (183 cm) tall and "happily bisexual". She regularly augmented her visual impact by performing topless or nude, her body decorated in iridescent or luminescent paint. In a 2007 BBC Four documentary, Lemmy described her as 6 ft 2 inches (188 cm) tall with a 52 inch (132 cm) bust and a bookbinder by trade. The same documentary said that she was working as a petrol pump attendant in Cornwall when she joined the band.

Stacia regarded most of what she did with the band as interpretive dance, although there were some set routines. She was an integral part of the early to mid-1970s Hawkwind show, particularly during the Space Ritual era. She left Hawkwind in 1975 after touring with them for the Warrior on the Edge of Time album. It may not have been her decision to leave.  Her departure, along with that of Lemmy (who went on to form Motörhead) and Robert Calvert, signalled the end of an era; though Calvert, after a guest appearance with the band at the Reading festival, decided to rejoin the band full-time towards the end of that year.

After Hawkwind
After leaving Hawkwind, Stacia returned to private life and married Roy Dyke. As former Hawkwind manager Doug Smith said in the October 2000 issue of Classic Rock magazine, "The last anybody heard, Stacia was married with children and living in Hamburg with her husband Roy Dyke, formerly of Ashton, Gardner and Dyke."  The couple has a daughter, Aysha Dyke, who lives in Hamburg and is currently in the band Generations of Music.

Stacia is now living in Ireland and working as an artist.

She has said about her work: "[It..] is greatly influenced by my love of nature, in all its aspects. Landscapes, people, animals, sound and movement. All these things permeate my being. I allow them to become part of me. After a time of reflection, all these impressions culminate in the creation of inner landscapes which are then released to create the images you see in my work."

Stacia Blake made a return to the stage in July 2019, appearing with former Hawkwind member Nik Turner and contemporary dancer Ms. Angel at Kozfest. The unannounced performance was Stacia's first since she last appeared with Hawkwind at Reading Festival in August 1975.

Artistic education
 1990 Freie Kunstschule, Hamburg, Germany
 1992 Limerick Senior College, Ireland
 1993 Crawford College of Art and Design, Ireland 
 1995 Erasmus exchange, Finland

Exhibitions

Solo shows
 1995 Taidemuseo - Joensuu, Finland
 1999 The Daffodil Gallery - Ireland
 2000 Oisin Gallery - Dublin, Ireland
 2001 Tinahely Courthouse Centre - Ireland
 2001 Domamaise Theatre & Centre for the Arts - Ireland
 2002 Kolin Ryynänen - Koli, Finland
 2002 Galleria, Petra Raasio - Joensuu, Finland
 2003 Bank of Ireland - Dublin, Ireland

Awards
 2001 Art Flight Air Lingus, Arts council
 2001 Three month residency at Koli, Finland (Arts Council, Joensuu, Finland)
 2005 Tyrone Guthrie Bursary (Arts Office Laois, County Council, Ireland)

Group shows
 1997 Bank of Ireland Exhibition - Skerries, Ireland
 1998 Sunlight Studios - Ireland
 1999 Sunlight Studios - Ireland
 1999 Post War Art & Design at Philips Auction House - Edinburgh, Scotland
 1999 Sunlight Studios - Ireland
 2000 Sunlight Studios - Ireland
 2001 Sunlight Studios - Ireland
 2002 Blue Leaf Gallery - Dublin, Ireland
 2002 Sunlight Studios - Ireland
 2003 Blue Leaf Gallery - Dublin, Ireland
 2004 Balbriggan Art Festival - Co. Dublin, Ireland
 2005 Balbriggan Art Festival - Co. Dublin, Ireland
 2006 Nebenan Ausstellung - Berlin, Germany

References

External links
 
Photos of Stacia at a concert in Copenhagen
A short article about Stacia
Article about Stacia and other Irish artists

1952 births
Living people
Bisexual artists
Bisexual women
LGBT dancers
Irish female dancers
Irish women artists